Kalamáta is the second most populous city of the Peloponnese peninsula, after Patras, in southern Greece and the largest city of the homonymous administrative region. As the capital and chief port of the Messenia regional unit, it lies along the Nedon River at the head of the Messenian Gulf.

The 2011 census recorded 69,849 inhabitants for the wider Kalamata Municipality, of which, 62,409 resided in the municipal unit of Kalamata, and 54,567 in the city proper. Kalamata is renowned as the land of the Kalamatianos dance and Kalamata olives.

Name
The modern name Kalamáta is a corruption of the older name Καλάμαι, Kalámai, "reeds". The phonetic similarity of Kalamáta with the phrase καλά μάτια "kalá mátia" ("good eyes") has led to various folk etymologies.

Administration
The municipality Kalamata was formed as part of the 2011 local government reform by the merger of the following four former municipalities, each of which subsequently became municipal units:

 Arfara
 Aris
 Kalamata
 Thouria

Subdivisions
The municipal unit of Kalamata is subdivided into the following communities (population according to the 2011 census, settlements within the community listed):

Municipal communities (population over 2,000):

 Kalamata (population: 54,567; Agioi Pantes, Agios Fanourios, Bournias, Filothei, Giannitsanika, Kalamata, Kallithea-Kourti Rachi, Kokkinorachi, Koutala, Menina, Moni Velanidias, Moni Profiti Ioil, Profitis Ilias)
 Verga (population: 2,252; Agriomata, Ano Verga, Kato Verga, Mousga, Pano Galari-Kampinari, Paralia Vergas)

Local communities (population under 2,000):

 Alagonia (population: 176; Alagonia, Machalas)
 Antikalamos (population: 361; Antikalamos, Goulismata)
 Artemisia (population: 142; Agios Ioannis Theologos, Artemisia, Theotokos)
 Asprochoma (population: 1,490; Akovitika, Asprochoma, Kagkareika, Kalami, Katsikovo, Lagkada-Dimitrakopouleika)
 Elaiochori (population: 270; Arachova, Dendra, Diasella, Elaiochori, Moni Dimiovis, Perivolakia)
 Karveli (population: 63; Agia Triada, Emialoi, Karveli, Kato Karveli)
 Ladas (population: 85; Agia Marina, Agios Vasileios, Ladas, Silimpoves-Agios Vasilis)
 Laiika (population: 1,253; Laiika, Katsaraiika, Spitakia, Xerokampi)
 Mikri Mantineia (population: 705; Alimoneika, Mikra Mantineia, Zouzouleika)
 Nedousa (population: 135)
 Piges (population: 80; Piges, Skourolakkos)
 Sperchogeia (population: 830)

Province
The province of Kalamata was one of the provinces of the Messenia Prefecture. Its territory corresponded with that of the current municipalities Kalamata and West Mani. It was abolished in 2006.

History

The history of Kalamata begins with Homer (Greek: Ομηρος) who mentions Firai, an ancient city built more or less where the Kalamata Castle stands today. It was long believed that the area that the city presently occupies was covered by the sea during ancient times, but the proto-Greek and archaic period remains (Poseidon temple) that were unearthed at Akovitika region prove otherwise.

Middle Ages

Pharai was rather unimportant in antiquity, and the site continued in obscurity until middle Byzantine times. Kalamata is first mentioned in the 10th-century Life of St. Nikon the Metanoeite, and experienced a period of prosperity in the 11th–12th centuries, as attested by the five surviving churches built in this period, including the Church of the Holy Apostles, as well as the comments of the Arab geographer al-Idrisi, who calls it a "large and populous" town.

Following the Fourth Crusade, Kalamata was conquered by Frankish feudal lords William of Champlitte and Geoffrey of Villehardouin in 1205, when its Byzantine fortress was apparently in so bad a state that it could not be defended against them. Thus, the town became part of the Principality of Achaea, and after Champlitte granted its possession to Geoffrey of Villehardouin, the town was the center of the Villehardouins' patrimony in the Principality. Prince William II of Villehardouin was born and died there. After William II's death in 1278, Kalamata remained in the hands of his widow, Anna Komnene Doukaina, but when she remarried to Nicholas II of Saint Omer, King Charles of Anjou was loath to see this important castle in the hands of a vassal, and in 1282 Anna exchanged it with lands elsewhere in Messenia.

In 1292 or 1293, two local Melingoi Slavic captains managed to capture the fortress of Kalamata by a ruse and, aided by 600 of their fellow villagers, took over the entire lower town as well in the name of the Byzantine emperor, Andronikos II Palaiologos. Constable John Chauderon in vain tried to secure their surrender, and was sent to Constantinople, where Andronikos agreed to hand the town over, but then immediately ordered his governor in Mystras not to do so. In the event, the town was recovered by the Franks through the intercession of a local Greek, a certain Sgouromalles. In 1298, the town formed the dowry of Princess Matilda of Hainaut upon her marriage to Guy II de la Roche. Matilda retained Kalamata as her fief until 1322, when she was dispossessed and the territory reverted to the princely domain. In 1358, Prince Robert gifted the châtellenie of Kalamata (comprising also Port-de-Jonc and Mani) to his wife, Marie de Bourbon, who kept it until her death in 1377. The town remained one of the largest in the Morea—a 1391 document places it, with 300 hearths, on par with Glarentza—but it nevertheless declined in importance throughout the 14th and 15th centuries in favour of other nearby sites like Androusa. Kalamata remained in Frankish hands until near the end of the Principality of Achaea, coming under the control of the Byzantine Despotate of the Morea only in 1428.

Ottoman period and War of Independence

Kalamata was occupied by the Ottomans from 1481 to 1685, like the rest of Greece. In 1659, during the long war between Ottomans and Venetians over Crete, the Venetian commander Francesco Morosini, came into contact with the rebellious Maniots, for a joint campaign in the Morea, in the course of which he took Kalamata. He was soon after forced to return to Crete, but the Venetians returned to the Morean War.

The Venetian Republic ruled Kalamata from 1685 as part of the "Kingdom of the Morea". During the Venetian occupation the city was fortified, developed and thrived economically. However, the Ottomans reoccupied Kalamata in the war of 1715 and controlled it until the Greek War of Independence.

Kalamata was the first city to be liberated as the Greeks rose in the Greek War of Independence. On 23 March 1821, it was taken over by the Greek revolutionary forces under the command of generals Theodoros Kolokotronis, Petros Mavromichalis and Papaflessas. However, in 1825, the invading Ibrahim Pasha destroyed the city.

Modern period 

In independent Greece, Kalamata was rebuilt and became one of the most important ports in the Mediterranean Sea. It is not surprising that the second-oldest Chamber of Commerce in the Mediterranean, after that of Marseille, exists in Kalamata. In 1934, a large strike of harbor workers occurred in Kalamata. The strike was violently suppressed by the government, resulting in the death of 5 workers and 2 other residents of the town.

During World War II on 29 April 1941, a battle was fought near the port between the invading German forces and the 2nd New Zealand Division, for which Jack Hinton was later awarded the Victoria Cross. Kalamata was liberated on September 9, 1944, after a battle between ELAS and the local Nazi collaborators.

Kalamata was again in the news on 13 September 1986, when it was hit by an earthquake that measured 6.2 on the surface wave magnitude scale. It was described as "moderately strong" but caused heavy damage throughout the city, killed 20 people and injured 330 others. 

Due to these efforts, Kalamata has now developed into a modern provincial capital and has returned to growth during the recent years. Today, Kalamata has the second largest population and mercantile activity in Peloponnese. It makes important exports, particularly of local products such as raisins, olives and olive oil. It is also the seat of the Metropolitan Bishop of Messenia. The current Metropolitan Bishop is Chrisostomus III, since 15 March 2007.

Sights

Maria Callas Alumni Association of the Music School of Kalamata / "Maria Callas Museum"

There are numerous historical and cultural sights in Kalamata, such as the Villehardouin castle, the Ypapanti Byzantine church, the Kalograion monastery with its silk-weaving workshop where the Kalamata scarves are made, and the municipal railway park. The Church of the Holy Apostles is where Mavromichalis declared the revolt against Ottoman rule in 1821. Art collections are housed at the Municipal Gallery, the Archaeological Museum of Messenia and the Folk Art Museum.

 Benakeion Archaeological Museum of Kalamata, located in the heart of the historical centre of Kalamata.
 Cultural events, such as the Kalamata International Dance Festival
 Kalamata Drama International Summer School 
 Kalamata Castle from the 13th century AD.
 The marina and the Port of Kalamata, located SW of the city centre, is the main and largest port in Messenia and the southern part of the Peloponnese.
 Kalamata Municipal Stadium, home of Messiniakos, seats 5,400 spectators
 The Railway Museum of the Municipality of Kalamata, a railway museum which first opened since 1986
 The Temple of Apollo Epicurius is about two-hour drive north from Kalamata.
 The Maria Callas Alumni Association of the Music School of Kalamata (www.mariacallas.gr) with the exhibition of the personal letters of the legendary Maria Callas.

Cathedral of Ypapanti
Kalamata's cathedral of the Ypapanti (Presentation of the Lord to the Temple) nestles beneath the 14th-century Frankish castle. The foundation stone was laid on 25 January 1860, and the building was consecrated on 19 August 1873. It suffered great damage during the 1986 earthquake, but was subsequently restored. The Festival of the Ypapanti (27 January through 9 February) is of national importance for the Greek Orthodox Church and, locally, the occasion for a holiday (2 February), when the litany of what is believed to be a miraculous icon, first introduced in 1889, takes place.

In late January 2010 the city hosted the Ecumenical Patriarch Bartholomew to celebrate the 150th anniversary of the cathedral. He was offered the golden key of the city. The region around Kalamata has provided two Ecumenical patriarchs in the past.

Economy

Kalamata's Chamber of Commerce is the second-oldest in the Mediterranean after Marseille. Kalamata is well known for its black Kalamata olives.

Karelia Tobacco Company has been in operation in Kalamata since 1888.

Historical population

Climate
Kalamata has a hot-summer mediterranean climate (Köppen Csa) with mild, wet winters and dry, hot summers. Kalamata receives plenty of precipitation days in winter. Summers are very hot and dry.

Transportation

Kalamata is accessed by GR-7/E55/E65 in the west, and GR-82 runs through Kalamata and into the Taygetus. The motorway to Kalamata from Tripoli is complete

Kalamata is served by a metre gauge railway line of the former Piraeus, Athens and Peloponnese Railways, now owned by the Hellenic Railways Organisation (OSE). There is a station and a small freight yard in the city, as well as a rolling stock maintenance depot to the north. There used to be a mainline train service to Kyparissia, Pyrgos and Patras, and a suburban service to Messini and the General Hospital. However, in December 2010, all train services from Kalamata, along with those in the rest of the Peloponnese south of Corinth, were discontinued on economic grounds, and the train station is now closed.  A previously disused extension line to the port is now a Railway Park, with old steam engines on display, and a café in the old station building.

There is a bus link, operated by the KTEL company, to Tripoli, Corinth, and Athens, with frequent services. Ferries are available to places such as the Greek islands of Kythira and Crete in the summer months. Also in the summer months, charter and scheduled flights fly direct to Kalamata International Airport from some European cities.  A scheduled service by Aegean Airlines once a day linking Kalamata and Athens International Airport commenced in 2010.

Kalamata also has four urban bus lines that cross the city and its suburbs.

Cuisine

Local specialities:

Kalamata olives
Lalagia
Diples (dessert)
Pasteli (dessert)
Talagani cheese
Sfela cheese

Notable people

Andreas Apostolopoulos (born 1952), real estate developer and sports team owner
Giannis Christopoulos (born 1972), football coach
Yiannis Chryssomallis ("Yanni") (born 1954), composer and musician
Vassilis C. Constantakopoulos (19352012), shipowner
George A. Iliopoulos (born 1987) actor, President of the Maria Callas Alumni Association
Aggeliki Daliani (born 1979) actress
Nikolaos Doxaras, painter
Panagiotis Doxaras, painter
Nikolaos Georgeas (born 1976), footballer
Alexandros Koumoundouros, Prime Minister of Greece in the 19th century
Elia Markopoulos, American professional wrestler who spent his childhood summers at his family's home in Kalamata.
Gerasimos Michaleas (1947), American Eastern Orthodox bishop
Panos Mihalopoulos (born 1949), actor
Nikos Moulatsiotis, footballer and coach
Sokratis Papastathopoulos (born 1988), footballer
Prokopis Pavlopoulos (born 1950) lawyer, university professor, politician, former President of Greece from 2015 to 2020
Vassilis Photopoulos (19342007) painter, film director, art director and set designer
Nikolaos Politis (18721942), diplomat, lawyer
Maria Polydouri (19021930), poet
Aris San (born Aristides Saisanas, 19401992), Greek-Israeli singer
Angelos Skafidas, footballer and coach
Kenny Stamatopoulos (born 1979), footballer
Michail Stasinopoulos (19032002) lawyer, President of the Republic of Greece
Gregory Stephanopoulos (born 1950) Professor of Chemical Engineering, MIT
William II of Villehardouin (died 1278) the last Villehardouin prince of Achaea
Mihalis Papagiannakis (19412009), Greek politician
Panagiotis Benakis (17001771), Greek notable
Stavros Kostopoulos (19001968), Greek banker and politician
Dimitrios Stefanakos (born 1936), Greek footballer
Konstantinos Ventiris (18921960), Greek army officer
Panagiotis Bachramis (19762010), Greek footballer
Nikos Economopoulos (born 1953), Greek photographer
Bleepsgr, Greek street artist

Sporting teams
Kalamata hosts a lot of notable sport clubs with earlier presence in the higher national divisions in Greek football. It also hosts one of the oldest Greek club, the club Messiniakos FC founded in 1888.

International relations

Twin towns—sister cities
Kalamata is twinned with:
 Aglantzia, Cyprus.
 Xi'an, China
 Lowell, Massachusetts, United States

See also
 List of cities and towns in Greece

References

External links

 Municipality of Kalamata 
 Historic maps of Kalamata
 Messinian Chamber of Commerce and Industry
 Ministry of Culture – Messinia
 Kalamata The Official website of the Greek National Tourism Organisation
 Greek Local Yellow Pages of Kalamata

 
Byzantine sites in Peloponnese (region)
Castles in the Peloponnese
Greek prefectural capitals
Mediterranean port cities and towns in Greece
Municipalities of Peloponnese (region)
Populated places in Messenia